The 2019 Mesterfinalen was supposed to be the third edition of Mesterfinalen and the 5th Norwegian super cup overall. Mesterfinalen is the annual game between the League champions and the Cup champions in Norway, or the second-placed team in Eliteserien if the same team are reigning League and Cup champions. The final will be played in March between league and cup champions and defending Mesterfinalen champions Rosenborg and the runner-up in the league, Molde.

On 15 January 2019, it was decided that the game will be played on Ullevaal Stadion in Oslo. The league winner decided the venue of the game.

On 15 March 2019, two days prior to the scheduled matchday, Mesterfinalen was cancelled due to heavy rain weather forecast on the match date. The Football Association of Norway (NFF) did not want to take risks with the pitch 9 days before Norway's Euro 2020 qualifying against Sweden on 26 March 2019. The decision received criticism from Molde manager Erling Moe who questioned NFF's planning.

References

Mesterfinalen
Mesterfinalen 2019
Mesterfinalen 2019
Mesterfinalen
Cancelled association football competitions